"Last Kiss" is Bonnie Pink's second single from her album Even So. The single was released under the Warner Music Japan label on April 7, 2004. Last Kiss was also used as the ending song of the anime Gantz.

Track listing
"Last Kiss"
"5 More Minutes"
"Last Kiss" (Instrumental)
"I'm in the Mood for Dancing"

Charts

Oricon Sales Chart

Songs about kissing
2004 singles
2004 songs
Anime songs
Bonnie Pink songs
Songs written by Bonnie Pink
Warner Music Japan singles